William Warren Corning (August 29, 1829June 19, 1895) was an American merchant and Democratic politician.  He was the 15th mayor of Portage, Wisconsin (1875–1877), and represented western Columbia County in the Wisconsin State Assembly for the 1872 session.

Biography
William Corning was born on August 29, 1829, in Mentor, Ohio.  His father died when he was five years old, but he still received an academic education.  He moved around central Ohio several times, going from Newark, to Hebron, to Columbus.  He moved to Portage, Wisconsin, in October 1858, and by March 1859 he had established his hardward business.  He served on the city council, the school board, and the Columbia County board of supervisors.

He was elected on the Democratic Party ticket to the Wisconsin State Assembly in 1871 from Columbia County's 1st Assembly district—at that time comprising the western part of the county.  He did not run for re-election in 1872.

He was elected mayor of Portage in 1875 and was re-elected to another term in 1876.

He died at the home of his daughter in Ironwood, Michigan, in 1895.  At the time he was a manager of a saw mill, employed by the Edward P. Allis Company.

References

External links
 

1829 births
1895 deaths
People from Mentor, Ohio
People from Portage, Wisconsin
Wisconsin city council members
County supervisors in Wisconsin
School board members in Wisconsin
19th-century American politicians
Mayors of places in Wisconsin
Democratic Party members of the Wisconsin State Assembly